The state highways of Colorado are a system of public paved roads funded and maintained by the Colorado Department of Transportation (CDOT) in the U.S. state of Colorado. These are state highways, which are typically abbreviated SH. The numbered highways within the state begin at 1 and increase, with exception of numbers already designated as United States Numbered Highways or Interstate Highways. In 1953, many highways were decommissioned or lost mileage. Before the 1968 Colorado state highway renumbering, highways were cosigned with U.S. Highways and Interstate Highways, and there were highways matching U.S. Highway and Interstate Highway numbers.

State highways

Special routes

See also

References

External links
The Highways of Colorado by Matthew Salek

 
Lists of roads in Colorado